Nasti Muzik is the third studio album from American rapper
Khia. The album was released on July 22, 2008 on Thug Misses Entertainment/Big Cat Records. One of the feature producers on the album is DJ Craze, with Gucci Mane and Maceo being the featured guest artists on the album.

"What They Do" was the first single off the album but did not chart but had a successful underground and streets impact. The second single, "Be Your Lady", was produced by Tampa's Push-a-Key Productions.

Track listing

References 

2008 albums
Khia albums
Big Cat Records (U.S. record label) albums